Eastpoint Mall is a one-level regional enclosed shopping center located in Baltimore County. Eastpoint Mall was one of Baltimore’s first shopping centers and has been serving the community since 1956.

Eastpoint Mall is anchored by JCPenney, Burlington, Gabe's, and Value City Furniture. The Mall features over 120 specialty shops, restaurants, and services including Foot Locker, Bath & Body Works, AT&T Wireless, Shoe City, Chick-fil-A, The Children’s Place, McDonald's, Shoe Show, Cricket Wireless, and Rue21.

History
In the current location of the mall was an open mall with outdoor walk ways connecting it which included stores such as Hutzler's and Hochschild Kohn's department store. In the 1970s, this open mall was enclosed, thereby making the location the present enclosed mall. JCPenney came to the mall in 1974. In 1981, a Record Bar store opened at the mall. The Hutzler's store closed in 1984 and became a food court in 1991, while Sears was also added. Value City and Value City Furniture later split the old Hochschild Kohn's building. Ames was also added as an anchor, later becoming Steve & Barry's. Steve & Barry's closed in 2008, becoming DSW and Shoppers World in 2010. DSW since closed in early 2016. The mall's fountain was based on Robert Woodward's El Alamein Fountain in Sydney. A half-dandelion version was at Towson Town Center. On November 2, 2017, it was announced that Sears would be closing as part of a plan to close 63 stores nationwide. The store closed in January 2018.

References

External links
Official site

Shopping malls in Maryland
Buildings and structures in Baltimore County, Maryland
Tourist attractions in Baltimore County, Maryland
Shopping malls established in 1956
JLL (company)
Dundalk, Maryland
1956 establishments in Maryland